La Toilette, also known as Rousse, is an 1889 painting by Henri de Toulouse-Lautrec. The painting depicts a red-headed woman, stripped to the waist, seated on the floor, facing away from the viewer, just before or just after bathing. Held by public collections in France since 1914, it has been at the Musée d'Orsay in Paris since 1983.

The painting depicts a domestic scene of a woman, sitting on a plain towel or sheet over a dark rug on the bare floorboards. She is largely undressed, with bare back, arms and head, hair tied back, and bare right thigh visible. A swathe of plain fabric is wrapped around her waist, with a black boot or stocking on her right lower leg. Other clothing is draped over a chair to the left.

The work was painted in oils on cardboard, and measures . It employs a light colour palette, predominantly blues with yellowish greens and red for the woman's hair, thinned with turpentine to create a loose effect. The Impressionist image, similar to a work in pastels or a sketch, with an elevated viewpoint, shows some influence from similar works by Edgar Degas, including those exhibited at the 8th (and last) Impressionist exhibition in Paris in 1886.

In the background are two wickerwork chairs and a bathtub, suggesting the woman is undressing to bathe, or getting dressed after washing. It may have been made in one session, directly from life, with no studies. The model may be one of Toulouse-Lautrec's favourites, Carmen Gaudin (1866?–1920).

It was catalogued as La toilette and dated 1896 for some time, but recent research suggests it was painted several years earlier, in 1889. It was one of two works that Toulouse-Lautrec exhibited with Les XX ("The twenty", an avant-garde art group) in Brussels in 1890 under the title Rousse (red-head). In the catalogue, it was described as "a red-haired woman seated on the floor, seen from the back, nude".

It was first displayed in the Musée du Luxembourg, then at the Musée National d'Art Moderne, and later at the Musée du Louvre. It was transferred to the Musée d'Orsay in 1983.

References
 
 Rousse dit aussi La Toilette (Rousse also called Toilet), Musée d'Orsay
 Henri de Toulouse-Lautrec, Rousse (La toilette), Musée d'Orsay
 Google Arts & Culture
 Masterpieces from Paris exhibition, 2009–10, National Gallery of Australia

Paintings by Henri de Toulouse-Lautrec
Paintings in the collection of the Musée d'Orsay
1889 paintings